Baddington is a civil parish in Cheshire East, England. It contains ten buildings that are recorded in the National Heritage List for England as designated listed buildings.  Of these,  one is listed at Grade II*, the middle grade, and the others are at Grade II.  The parish is entirely rural.  The Shropshire Union Canal runs through it, and seven of the listed buildings are associated with the canal, three bridges, two locks, and two mileposts.  The other listed buildings are farmhouses.

Key

Buildings

References

Listed buildings in the Borough of Cheshire East
Lists of listed buildings in Cheshire